Rhyzodiastes maderiensis is a species of ground beetle in the subfamily Rhysodinae. It was described by Louis Alexandre Auguste Chevrolat in 1873. It is found in Brazil; the specific name refers to Madeira River.

References

Rhyzodiastes
Beetles of South America
Beetles described in 1873
Taxa named by Louis Alexandre Auguste Chevrolat